The Crown Spa Hotel (formerly the Crown Hotel) is a large hotel in Scarborough, North Yorkshire, England, overlooking the town's South Bay. Built in 1844, it was Scarborough's first purpose-built hotel and has been extensively renovated to 21st-century four-star status.

History
The original Crown Hotel was reputedly designed by Malton architect John Gibson and opened by John Fairgray Sharpin on 10 June 1845. It was one of the first purpose-built hotels in the world as well as the first in Scarborough.

The hotel has been a location for television and film productions, including Little Voice, Heartbeat, The Royal, and A is for Acid.

The hotel lost its 1978 "four-star" rating in the 1990s and was purchased by a new owner in February 2000. Four-star status was restored in 2008.

Redevelopment controversy
In 2005, the hotel overcame objections by local residents and secured approval for plans to increase its accommodation to 161 bedrooms. In 2007, there were successful public objections to decking and a gazebo erected in front of the hotel without planning permission, and to inappropriate artificial construction material.

References

"Scarborough 150 Years of Hospitality" by Basics Plus Scarborough; 72 page paperback book sold locally
Scarborough library and information centre Vernon Road Local History section

External links
 Official website
 Live webcamera feed looking over South Bay
 

Hotels in Scarborough, North Yorkshire
Hotel buildings completed in 1844
Grade II* listed buildings in North Yorkshire
Hotels established in 1845